Church of the Divine Providence is a Catholic church in Słobódka, Belarus, listed as a national Cultural Heritage object.

The Church of the Divine Providence was built on the site of an older church, which was in turn constructed in 1806. The old church was replaced when it was no longer able to accommodate the parish. The new church was decorated in the Romanesque Revival style. It received two tall five-storey towers topped with a peaked tented roof.

The church was closed from 1949 to 1953 and repurposed as a granary. The pipe organ was damaged during World War II and restored only in 1999.

Gallery

References

External links 
 Video in Russian

Churches in Belarus
Landmarks in Belarus